Lisowice  is a village in the administrative district of Gmina Pawonków, within Lubliniec County, Silesian Voivodeship, in southern Poland.
 

Abundant skeletons of the Upper Triassic tetrapods (i.e., large dicynodonts, dinosaurs) were described from the clay pit located between Lisowice and Lipie Śląskie.

References
 J. Dzik, G. Niedźwiedzki, T. Sulej, 2008: Zaskakujące uwieńczenie ery gadów ssakokształtnych. Ewolucja, 3: 2-21. 

Lisowice